Joanna Toh (born 3 October 1996) is a Singaporean netball player who represents Singapore internationally and plays in the position of goalkeeper. She was part of the Singaporean squad at the 2019 Netball World Cup, which was also her first World Cup appearance.

References 

1996 births
Living people
Singaporean netball players
2019 Netball World Cup players
Singaporean sportspeople of Chinese descent
21st-century Singaporean women